Jean Giraud (2 February 1936 – 27 or 28 March 2007) was a French mathematician, a student of Alexander Grothendieck. His research focused on non-abelian cohomology and the theory of topoi. In particular, he authored the book Cohomologie non-abélienne (Springer, 1971) and proved the theorem that bears his name, which gives a characterization of a Grothendieck topos.

From 1969 to 1989, he was a professor at École normale supérieure de Saint-Cloud.

From 1993 to 1994, he was deputy director for research of École normale supérieure de Lyon, where he was made interim director in 1994 and director from 1995 to 2000.

References

External links
 Jean Giraud, 1936– at Library of Congress Authorities – with 4 catalogue records

1936 births
2007 deaths
French mathematicians
University of Paris alumni
Place of birth missing
Place of death missing